Eric Benjamin Allen (May 18, 1949 – October 27, 2015) was an American gridiron football player.  He played college football for the Michigan State Spartans football team from 1969 to 1971 and professional football for the Toronto Argonauts of the Canadian Football League from 1972 to 1975.

A 1968 graduate of Howard High School in Georgetown, South Carolina, Allen gained over 3,000 combined rushing and passing yards for Michigan State. On October 30, 1971, Allen set an NCAA single-game record with 350 rushing yards on 29 carries in a 43-10 win over Purdue. He broke the prior record of 347 yards set by Ron Johnson of Michigan in 1968.  During the 1971 season, Allen led the Big Ten Conference in both rushing yardage (1,410), yards from scrimmage (1,769), rushing yards per carry (5.8), and touchdowns (18).  He was the first Big Ten player to score more than 100 points in a season. Allen finished 10th in the Heisman Trophy voting in 1971.

Allen was drafted by the Baltimore Colts in the fourth round of the 1972 NFL Draft, but did not sign and played in the CFL for the Toronto Argonauts. During his rookie year with the Argonauts, he caught 53 passes for 1,067 yards and eight touchdowns.  He also gained 220 rushing yards on 50 carries during the 1972 season.

Allen died in hospice care at his hometown on October 27, 2015.

Career statistics

References

1949 births
2015 deaths
American football running backs
Canadian football wide receivers
Michigan State Spartans football players
Toronto Argonauts players
People from Georgetown, South Carolina
Players of American football from South Carolina
African-American players of American football
African-American players of Canadian football